Gonbadbardi-ye Sofla (also Romanized as Gonbadbardī-ye Soflá) is a village in Bahmai-ye Garmsiri-ye Jonubi Rural District, in the Central District of Bahmai County, Kohgiluyeh and Boyer-Ahmad Province, Iran. At the 2006 census, its population was 167, in 33 families.

References 

Populated places in Bahmai County